Maureen Helena Pugh  (born 1958) is a New Zealand politician who is a Member of Parliament for the National Party. She has twice appeared to have won a list seat based on preliminary results, then missed out on a seat when the final results came in, then entered Parliament anyway to replace a retiring MP. In her third election, in 2020, she outright won a list seat.

She has previously served as the mayor of the Westland District.

Political career

Westland District Council 
Pugh was elected to the Westland District Council in 1998 and served two terms before being elected as the district's first woman mayor in 2004, succeeding John Drylie. In 2007 she was returned as mayor unopposed. She stood down at the 2013 elections and was succeeded as mayor by Michael Havill.

While serving as mayor of Westland District Council, Pugh was accused of failure to declare a financial conflict of interest.

General elections and Member of Parliament

2014 election and first tenure 
In the 2014 general election Pugh contested the West Coast-Tasman electorate as the candidate of the New Zealand National Party. Also ranked number 52 on the National Party list, she just missed out on winning a list seat. Based on preliminary results, she would have entered Parliament, but in the final results, National's proportion of the party vote reduced and the Green Party's Steffan Browning won the seat she would have taken. Pugh remained first in line should a vacancy arise in a list seat held by a National Party MP during the 51st New Zealand Parliament, and following Tim Groser's resignation in December 2015 she was sworn in as a member of parliament on 9 February 2016 after the summer recess.

2017 election 
In the 2017 general election Pugh had a higher ranking of 44 in the National Party list, and again preliminary results indicated that National had won enough seats (58) for Pugh to return to Parliament. However, the official count showed that National had won two fewer seats than the preliminary count indicated, meaning that Pugh did not return to Parliament. Due to her history of going in and out of parliament frequently due to special votes, Pugh describes herself as the 'Yo-yo MP'. As before, Pugh was in line to enter Parliament if there were resignations, and in February 2018 Pugh and several other "next-in-line" list candidates attended National's parliamentary caucus meeting to help ease their transition into parliament should they enter. In March 2018, Bill English resigned from Parliament and Pugh was declared elected as a list MP.

In Opposition 

National Party leader Simon Bridges, who was in office from 2018 to 2020, described Pugh as "fucking useless" in a phone call with Jami-Lee Ross that Ross released on Facebook in October 2018. After the release of the recording, Bridges apologised to Pugh. Pugh later voted with the majority against Bridges in the May 2020 leadership election.

During the 2020 general election, preliminary results again showed that Pugh would enter Parliament as a list MP, having lost the West Coast-Tasman electorate. This time, final official results showed that she had retained her list seat. On 10 November, following the release of the final results, the National caucus elected her as its Junior Whip. Following the counting of special votes Pugh was confirmed as an MP. In line with previous elections she had been anticipating losing her seat once again and had already packed up her office belongings, which she had to have sent back to parliament.

In February 2022 Pugh expressed support through Facebook for Convoy 2022, a protest group who travelled to Wellington to occupy the grounds of parliament, protesting vaccine mandates as well as some opposing the vaccine itself. Pugh later amended, then deleted the post, and said she did not realise many of the protesters were against Covid-19 vaccination. After the occupation of parliament grounds was over, Pugh said that "we [the National Party had one or two members [party members, not Members of Parliament] in there talking with protestors on an almost daily basis... we wrote to the only email address we had and said we would enter dialogue as soon as they stopped the unlawful aspects to their protest." A National Party spokesperson said that "National did not send anyone—MPs, members or otherwise—to enter in discussions with protestors. However we are aware of party members who attended the protest of their own accord".

Views and positions 
Pugh revealed in 2016 that she does not believe in pharmaceutical drugs, saying that she never takes any kind of medication and has only ever given her children chiropractic treatments. She said that nature delivers whatever people need, and that "there's nothing wrong with getting a cold or getting a flu – if you have a healthy immune system you can deal with it." The following day she wrote "I do support the use of pharmaceuticals, such as Panadol and anaesthetic". Pugh was one of the last Members of Parliament to receive a Covid-19 vaccination.

On cannabis, Pugh said that she did not support its decriminalisation, having seen its negative effects on some people, but she was not opposed to people "smoking or digesting a natural plant", adding, "I'm just talking about giving the poor lady whose got lymphoma a plant to smoke, which she can grow in her backyard."

On climate change, Pugh stated that, while she believed in it, she had yet to see evidence of anthropocentric causes of that change. National Party leader Christopher Luxon responded to Pugh's refusal to say she believes in man-made climate change by stating "If you're a climate denier ... that's not an acceptable position". Pugh later reversed her position, saying that she accepted that human-induced climate change was real and that it was a factor in extreme weather such as Cyclone Gabrielle. Radio New Zealand journalist Guyon Espiner likened the retraction to a "hostage video".

Personal life
Pugh was educated at St Mary's High School, Greymouth. Pugh and her husband John live on their farm in a mountain valley at Turiwhate, near Kumara. The house's former copper piping acted as a conductor for electrical storms, and Pugh has been struck by lightning three times. 

In the 2014 New Year Honours, Pugh was appointed an Officer of the New Zealand Order of Merit for services to local government.

References

1958 births
Living people
New Zealand National Party MPs
Women mayors of places in New Zealand
Mayors of Westland, New Zealand
Unsuccessful candidates in the 2014 New Zealand general election
Unsuccessful candidates in the 2017 New Zealand general election
Officers of the New Zealand Order of Merit
People from the West Coast, New Zealand
21st-century New Zealand politicians
21st-century New Zealand women politicians
New Zealand list MPs
Members of the New Zealand House of Representatives
People educated at John Paul II High School, Greymouth